Mexicana Universal Baja California Sur is a pageant in Baja California Sur, Mexico, that selects that state's representative for the national Mexicana Universal pageant.

The State Organization has produced one winner for Miss Universe in 2013 and two designated for Miss International in 2011 and 2012.

Mexicana Universal Baja California Sur is located at number 10 with three crown of Nuestra Belleza México/Mexicana Universal.

Titleholders
Below are the names of the annual titleholders of Mexicana Universal Baja California Sur, listed in ascending order, and their final placements in the Mexicana Universal after their participation, until 2017 the names are as Nuestra Belleza Baja California Sur.

1 Jessica García Formenti was a semifinalist in the Top 15, but by fulfilling the characteristics of a Queen, was designated as Nuestra Belleza Internacional México to represent the country in Miss International 2012.
2 Karen Higuera was a finalist in the Top 10, but by fulfilling the characteristics of a Queen, was designated as Nuestra Belleza Internacional México to represent the country in Miss International 2011.

 Competed in Miss Universe.
 Competed in Miss International.
 Competed in Miss Charm International.
 Competed in Miss Continente Americano.
 Competed in Reina Hispanoamericana.
 Competed in Miss Orb International.
 Competed in Nuestra Latinoamericana Universal.

Designated Contestants
As of 2000, isn't uncommon for some States to have more than one delegate competing simultaneously in the national pageant. The following Nuestra Belleza Baja California Sur contestants were invited to compete in Nuestra Belleza México only in 2007.

External links
Official Website

Baja California Sur
Baja California Sur